United Community Banks, Inc. (NASDAQ: UCBI) is a bank holding company headquartered in Blairsville, Georgia, with executive offices in Greenville, South Carolina. United is one of the largest full-service financial institutions in the Southeast, with $22.5 billion in assets, and 161 offices in Florida, Georgia, North Carolina, South Carolina and Tennessee. United Community Bank, United's wholly owned bank subsidiary, specializes in personalized community banking services for individuals, small businesses and companies throughout its geographic footprint, including Florida under the brand Seaside Bank and Trust. Services include a full range of consumer and commercial banking products, including mortgage, advisory, treasury management, and wealth management.

Formed in 1950 as Union County Bank, United has operated on the philosophy of providing exceptional banking service while caring deeply for the communities it serves. This philosophy has fueled the company's growth from a $40 million bank a little more than three decades ago.

United's success comes from its strong, talented and experienced management team, as well as the dynamic growth markets they serve. Its business model includes local bank presidents with an average of 20 years in community banking experience, 90% of which has been in their local markets. Additional information about United Community Banks, Inc. and its full range of services and products can be found at www.ucbi.com.

Products
United offers a full range of consumer and commercial banking products including mortgage services, interest-bearing and non interest-bearing deposits, NOW accounts (Negotiable Order of Withdrawal account), money market accounts, checking accounts, savings accounts, and advisory and treasury management services. Through its wholly owned subsidiary Navitas Credit Corp., United also offers equipment lending.

Executives
H. Lynn Harton, President and chief executive officer 
Jefferson Harralson, Chief Financial Officer
Rob Edwards, Chief Risk Officer
Rich Bradshaw, President and Chief Banking Officer
Melinda Davis Lux, EVP & General Counsel
Mark Terry, Chief Information Officer

History
Union County Bank began in 1949 in Blairsville, Georgia, and had $42 million in assets when Jimmy C. Tallent became president in 1984.

United Community Banks was incorporated in 1987. Union County Bank was acquired in 1988 and became United Community Bank (Georgia) in 1996. Other acquisitions were Citizens Bank of Murphy, North Carolina which became United Community Bank (North Carolina) in 1990, United Community Bank Towns County in 1992, White County Bank of Cleveland, Georgia (United Community Bank White County) in 1995 and United Community Bank Rabun County in 1997. The North Carolina bank added branches in Andrews, Franklin and Waynesville in 1995. With changes in Georgia's banking laws, United Community Bank began opening branches in addition to making acquisitions. Other acquisitions included assets of a bank in Cornelia and First Clayton Bank and Trust in 1997.

In 1999, UCB paid $7.1 million plus other costs for Bank of Adairsville parent Adairsville Bancshares, and also acquired 1st Floyd Bank. Both of these became part of United Community Bank (Georgia) in 2001.

In 2000, North Point Bancshares Inc., Independent Bancshares Inc. and consultant Brintech, Inc. were acquired and Lendmark Financial Services Inc. purchased the consumer finance division.

UCB was listed on Nasdaq in 2002.

In 2003, First Georgia Holding Inc. was acquired for about $42 million, and UCB also acquired First Central Bank of Lenoir City, Tennessee. In 2004, when assets reached $5 billion, acquisitions included Fairbanco Holding Co. for $24.7 million, Eagle National Bank for $12.4 million, Liberty National Bancshares Inc. for $42.5 million.

The first public stock offering came in 2005.

In 2006, Southern National Bank parent Southern Bancorp was acquired for stock valued at $67.8 million and merged into United Community Bank, and two Sylva, North Carolina offices were purchased from First Charter Bank, giving UCB 19 North Carolina locations.
 
In 2007, First Bank of the South parent Gwinnett Commercial Group was acquired for $222.9 million.

In 2009, UCB purchased assets and most liabilities of Southern Community Bank, with the FDIC paying $31 million.

In 2014, UCB purchased assets of Business Carolina Inc. for $31.3 million.

In 2015, UCB acquired MoneyTree Corporation and its wholly owned bank subsidiary, First National Bank, of Lenoir City, TN.

In 2015, Palmetto Bancshares, Inc. merged with United Community Banks.

On June 27, 2017, Four Oaks Fincorp of Four Oaks, North Carolina, started in 1912, agreed to a $124 million deal which would give United Community Bank 14 more North Carolina branches, twelve of those in the Triangle and an additional $737 million in assets.

In 2018, NLFC Holdings Corp. and its wholly owned subsidiary Navitas Credit Corp. were acquired for $130 million.

In July 2020, Three Shores Bancorporation, Orlando, Florida and it's wholly owned subsidiary, Seaside Bank and Trust, was acquired, with full conversion, expected in February, 2021, adding 14 Florida locations to United Community Bank's network.

In January 2021, UCB announced plans to move the corporate headquarters to downtown Greenville, South Carolina for a new $30 million building.

On October 1, 2021, UCB announced the closing of the purchase of Aquesta Financial Holdings Inc., based in Cornelius, North Carolina, for $131 million in a cash-and-stock deal. The combined bank has $18.6 billion in assets.

In January 2022, UCB announced the completion of its merger with Reliant Bancorp.

In May 2022, UCB announced their merger with Progress Bank & Trust, headquartered in Huntsville, Alabama. The merger is expected to take place during October and November of 2022.

References

External links

 

Companies based in Union County, Georgia
Banks based in Georgia (U.S. state)
Companies listed on the Nasdaq
1950 establishments in Georgia (U.S. state)
American companies established in 1950
Banks established in 1950
Banks based in South Carolina
Companies based in Greenville, South Carolina